Franco Colturi (born 26 January 1970) is an Italian former alpine skier who competed in the 1992 Winter Olympics.}

References

External links
 

1970 births
Living people
Italian male alpine skiers
Olympic alpine skiers of Italy
Alpine skiers at the 1992 Winter Olympics
Alpine skiers of Centro Sportivo Carabinieri